Kang-e Sofla (also Romanized as Kang-e Soflá and Kang Sofla; also known as Kang-e Pā’īn) is a village in Zaveh Rural District, in the Central District of Zaveh County, Razavi Khorasan Province, Iran. At the 2006 census, its population was 763, in 214 families.

References 

Populated places in Zaveh County